Laughing Horse is a British comedy promotion company and venue operator.

The company was established in the UK in 1998, and now operates venues in Aldershot, Brighton, Cirencester, Hitchin, London (Brixton, Covent Garden, Lancaster Gate, Paddington), Manchester, St Neots, Thetford and Wyboston. They run three venues at Brighton Fringe, seventeen at Edinburgh Fringe and also have a presence at the Perth, Adelaide and Melbourne Fringes. It is run by Alex Petty and Kevin McCarron.

At Edinburgh, they have run the Free Edinburgh Fringe Festival since 2004. At these shows, audiences do not have to buy tickets. They simply pay what they choose as a donation at the end of the show.

Since 2001, they have run the Laughing Horse New Act of the Year competition, which has been won by several famous British comedians at early stages of their career. For that reason, it has been called "a big deal to British newcomers". Greg Davies won the competition on his fourth ever gig, and Russell Kane won it within the first six months of his career. Others to have won or made the final include Rhod Gilbert, Nina Conti, Jack Whitehall and Carl Donnelly. The company also run comedy training courses.

New Act of the Year Winners
2001 - Matt Blaize
2002 - Greg Davies
2003 - Marek Larwood
2004 - Russell Kane
2005 - James Branch
2006 - Carl Donnelly
2007 - Daniel Rigby
2008 - Darren Ruddell as "Kev"
2009 - Sam Gore
2010 - Julian Deane
2011 - Adam Belbin
2012 - Bobby Mair
2013 - Sofie Hagen
2014 - Jenny Collier
2015 - Donal Vaughan
2018 - Janine Harouni

The Edinburgh Fringe 
Laughing Horse run numerous venues at The Edinburgh Fringe under the name The Free Festival with past acts including Joel Dommett, Paul McAffrey, Ahir Shah, and Sean Mcloughlin. In 2011, Imran Yusuf was the first show on a free venue to be nominated for the Edinburgh Comedy Awards Best Newcomer prize.

References

External links
Official website
Free Edinburgh Fringe Festival website

Edinburgh Festival Fringe